Vangueria is a genus of flowering plants in the family Rubiaceae.

Distribution
The genus contains over 50 species distributed in Africa south of the Sahara with one species occurring in Madagascar (V. madagascariensis). The centre of diversity is in East Africa (Kenya, Tanzania) and they are rare in West Africa.

Bacterial leaf symbiosis
Endophytic bacteria are housed in the intercellular space of the leaf mesophyll tissue. The presence of these bacteria can only be microscopically ascertained. The bacteria are identified as Burkholderia, which is a genus that is also found in the leaves of other Rubiaceae species. The hypothesis is that these endophytic bacteria provide chemical protection against insect herbivory.

Gousiekte
Several Vangueria species - V. latifolia, V. pygmaea, V. thamnus - are known to cause , a cardiotoxicosis of ruminants characterised by heart failure four to eight weeks after ingestion of certain rubiaceous plants.

Species

 Vangueria agrestis (Schweinf. ex Hiern.) Lantz
 Vangueria albosetulosa (Verdc.) Lantz
 Vangueria apiculata K.Schum.
 Vangueria bicolor K.Schum.
 Vangueria bowkeri (Robyns) Lantz
 Vangueria burnettii (Tennant) Lantz
 Vangueria burttii (Verdc.) Lantz
 Vangueria chariensis A.Chev. ex Robyns
 Vangueria cinerascens (Welw. ex Hiern.) Lantz
 Vangueria cinnamomea Dinter
 Vangueria cistifolia (Welw. ex Hiern.) Lantz
 Vangueria coerulea (Robyns) Lantz
 Vangueria cyanescens Robyns
 Vangueria discolor (De Wild.) Lantz
 Vangueria domatiosa  J.E.Burrows
 Vangueria dryadum S.Moore
 Vangueria esculenta S.Moore
 Vangueria ferruginea (Welw.) ined.
 Vangueria fulva (Robyns) Lantz
 Vangueria fuscosetulosa (Verdc.) Lantz
 Vangueria gillettii (Tennant) Lantz
 Vangueria glabrata K.Schum.
 Vangueria gossweileri (Robyns) Lantz
 Vangueria induta (Bullock) Lantz
 Vangueria infausta Burchell
 Vangueria kerstingii Robyns
 Vangueria lasiantha (Sond.) Sond.
 Vangueria latifolia (Sond.) Sond.
 Vangueria loranthifolia K.Schum.
 Vangueria macrocalyx Sond.
 Vangueria madagascariensis J.F.Gmel.
 Vangueria micropyren (Verdc.) Lantz
 Vangueria mollis (Robyns) Lantz
 Vangueria monteiroi (Oliv.) Lantz
 Vangueria obtusifolia K.Schum.
 Vangueria pachyantha (Robyns) Lantz
 Vangueria pallidiflora (Bullock) Lantz
 Vangueria parvifolia Sond.
 Vangueria praecox Verdc.
 Vangueria proschii Briq
 Vangueria psammophila (K.Schum.) Lantz
 Vangueria pygmaea Schltr.
 Vangueria quarrei (Robyns) Lantz
 Vangueria randii S.Moore
 Vangueria rhodesiaca (Tennant) Lantz
 Vangueria rufescens (E.A.Bruce) Lantz
 Vangueria schliebenii (Verdc.) Lantz
 Vangueria schumanniana (Robyns) Lantz
 Vangueria senegalensis Benth. & Hook.f. ex Hiern
 Vangueria silvicola O.Lachenaud
 Vangueria solitariiflora (Verdc.) Lantz
 Vangueria soutpansbergensis N.Hahn
 Vangueria thamnus (Robyns) Lantz
 Vangueria triflora (Robyns) Lantz
 Vangueria venosa (Hochst.) Sond.
 Vangueria verticillata (Robyns) Lantz
 Vangueria vestita (Robyns) ined.
 Vangueria volkensii K.Schum.

References

 
Rubiaceae genera
Taxonomy articles created by Polbot